Sveta Trojica may refer to several places in Slovenia: 

Sveta Trojica, Bloke, a settlement in the Municipality of Bloke
Sveta Trojica, Domžale, a settlement in the Municipality of Domžale
Sveta Trojica v Slovenskih Goricah, a settlement in the Municipality of Sveta Trojica v Slovenskih Goricah